Four vessels of the United States Navy have been named USS Charlotte, after the city of Charlotte, North Carolina.

  was a Confederate schooner captured by Federal forces in 1862 and used until 1867.
  was the armored cruiser North Carolina renamed in 1920, a year before decommissioning.
  was a patrol frigate used by the United States Coast Guard during World War II.
  is a  nuclear-attack submarine commissioned in 1994.

Sources

United States Navy ship names